Na-Pukhuri Shiva Dol or Rudrasagar Shiva Dol in an 18th century Hindu temple constructed during the reign of king Lakshmi Singha (1769-1780). This temple is 8 km away from Sivasagar town.  This is the last temple built during the Ahom era which represents grandeur before its overall decline in temple building and architectural building. This temple is located on the south bank of Rudrasagar Pukhuri which was excavated in honor of Rudra Singha, as this pond was dug on the opposite of Athaiphukhuri, which was dug during the reign of Jayadhwaj Singha this is also called Na-Pukhuri (New-pond) and the former is called Purani Pukhuri (Old-pond).

This temple dedicated to Shiva was constructed in 1773 and consecrated during the reign of Gaurinath Singha (1780-1794).  It's a Tri-Ratha type temple raised on an octagonal base. The height of the temple is 25.95 metere (85.13 feet). The construction of the temple was supervised by one Madan Darika Hajarika.

Gallery

References

External sources 

 

Hindu temples in Assam
Shiva temples in Assam
Sivasagar
Tourist attractions in Assam
Tourism in Assam
18th-century Hindu temples